This page provides links to lists of amusement parks by region (below), and alphabetically beginning with the name of the park (right).

By region 
 Africa

 America

 Asia

 Oceania

 Europe

Amusement parks